Uvas Canyon County Park is a  natural park located in upper Uvas Canyon on the eastern side of the Santa Cruz Mountains, west of Morgan Hill, California.  The park has several small waterfalls, some of which flow perennially, that feed into tributaries confluent with Uvas Creek.  The park is part of the Santa Clara County Parks System, and facilitates picnics, hiking and overnight camping.  It is one of the few parks in the area that allows dogs in the campgrounds.

Access to Uvas Canyon County Park is via Croy Road, a two-lane paved secondary road off Uvas Road with no outlet that narrows to a single lane within the small private community of Sveadal, just before the park entrance.

History
In 2017, heavy rains damaged parts of Croy Road as well as much of the park's trail system.  After significant repairs, the park has now been re-opened.

Flora 
A partial list of trees and plants found in the park is described in the park's Waterfall Loop Nature Trail Guide.  Some are non-native species, brought in by early settlers.
 Bigleaf Maple (Acer macrophyllum)
 Blackberry (Rubus ursinus)
 California Buckeye (Aesculus californica)
 California Juniper (Juniperus californica)
 California Laurel (Umbellularia californica)
 California Nutmeg (Torreya californica)
 California Sagebrush (Artemisia californica)
 Canyon Live Oak (Quercus chrysolepis)
 Coast Redwood (Sequoia sempervirens)
 Coastal Wood Fern (Dryopteris arguta)
 Coyote Brush (Baccharis spp.)
 Douglas Fir (Pseudotsuga menziesii)
 Golden Back Fern (Pentagramma triangularis)
 Madrone (Arbutus menziesii)
 Miner's Lettuce (Claytonia perfoliata)
 Poison Oak (Toxicodendron diversilobum)
 Sticky Monkey Flower (Diplacus aurantiacus)
 Western Sword Fern (Polystichum munitum)
 Tanbark Oak (Lithocarpus densiflorus)
 Thimbleberry (Rubus parviflorus)
 Tree of Heaven (Ailanthus altissima)
 Western Sycamore (Platanus racemosa)
 White Alder (Alnus rhombifolia)
 Wood Rose (Rosa gymnocarpa)

 Periwinkle (Vinca major)
 Trailing Myrtle (Vinca minor)

Fauna
Some animals native to the area include:
 Anna's Hummingbird
 Banana Slug
 Black-tailed Deer
 California Carpenter Bee
 California Newt
 California Quail
 Convergent Lady Beetle
 Coyote
 Mountain Lion
 Red-tailed Hawk
 Steller's Jay
 Santa Cruz Garter Snake
 Tarantula
 Turkey Vulture
 Wild Turkey

Waterfalls 

The park has seven small waterfalls, five of which are named on park maps and identified with signposts:
 Basin Falls 
 Black Rock Falls 
 Granuja Falls
 Triple Falls 
 Upper Falls 
The streams are rain and spring fed. Even though the streams are perennial, the best time to visit these waterfalls is after recent rains.

References

External links 

Municipal parks in California
County Parks in Santa Clara County, California
Santa Cruz Mountains
Landforms of Santa Clara County, California